Machemer is a surname. Notable people with the surname include:

Dave Machemer (born 1951), American baseball player, manager, and scout
Helmut Machemer (1902/03–1942), German ophthalmologist and army officer
Robert Machemer (1933–2009), German-American ophthalmologist and inventor